Minnehaha is an unincorporated community in El Paso County, Colorado, and a siding of the Pikes Peak Cog Railway. It is named for a character in The Song of Hiawatha.

History
It was once a community of rustic summer homes, and the home of the Pikes Peak Alpine Laboratory, a botanical research station founded by Frederic and Edith Clements.

References

Unincorporated communities in El Paso County, Colorado
Unincorporated communities in Colorado